Tigray may refer to:

 Tigray Region, a region of Ethiopia 
 Tigray Province, a province of Ethiopia until 1995
 Tigrayan-Tigrinya people (disambiguation)
Tigrayans, an ethnographic group in Ethiopia
Tigrinya people, an ethnographic group in Eritrea
 Tigrinya language, a language spoken by Tigrayans

See also

 Tigray War
 
 Tigre (disambiguation)

Language and nationality disambiguation pages